U.S. Route 123 (US 123) is a spur of US 23 in the U.S. states of Georgia and South Carolina. The U.S. Highway runs  from US 23, US 441, SR 15 and SR 365 near Clarkesville, Georgia, north and east to Interstate 385 Business (I-385 Business) in Greenville, South Carolina. US 123 parallels I-85 to the north as it connects the Northeast Georgia cities of Clarkesville and Toccoa with the western Upstate South Carolina communities of Westminster, Seneca, Clemson, Easley, and Greenville.

Route description
The U.S. Highway runs concurrently with SR 365 for its entire length in Georgia. US 123 is part of the National Highway System from its southern terminus to SR 17 and SR 184 near Toccoa and from US 76 and SC 28 in Clemson to SC 183 in Greenville.

Clarkesville to Seneca

US 123 begins at a partial interchange with US 23, US 441, SR 15 and SR 365 east of Clarkesville. The interchange provides access between US 123 and those highways in the direction of Cornelia, Gainesville, and Atlanta. Access to northbound US 23, US 441, and SR 15 is provided via SR 17 (Toccoa Highway), which US 123 meets at its next intersection and with which the highway begins to run concurrently. US 123 and SR 17 head east along a four-lane divided highway through Chattahoochee National Forest. The highways cross the Habersham–Stephens county line and pass over Norfolk Southern Railway's Greenville District while passing along the north side of Currahee Mountain. At their intersection with SR 184 (Dicks Hill Parkway), SR 17 continues southeast along the divided highway toward Lavonia while US 123 turns north and joins SR 184 on Curahee Street, which forms the border of the national forest until the highways reach the city limits of Toccoa.

US 123 and SR 184 gain a center turn lane and cross a Norfolk Southern rail line as they approach the downtown area. In the center of town, the highway begins to parallel the Greenville District rail line and intersects Broad Street, which carries SR 63 and SR 106 south of the intersection and SR 184 to the north. US 123 passes the Toccoa Amtrak station and intersects SR 17 Alternate (Big A Road), where the center turn lane ends. The highway passes Toccoa Airport and veers away from the railroad on the eastern edge of the city. US 123 passes by the historic site Travelers Rest before crossing the Tugaloo River branch of Lake Hartwell into Oconee County, South Carolina. From outside of Toccoa until its meeting with US 76 in Westminster, US 123 is a peaceful two-lane road with light traffic passing through mostly forest. The highway parallels the left bank of the lake to the mouth of the Chauga River, then curves north and crosses over the Greenville District before entering the town of Westminster, where the highway intersects US 76 (North Avenue).

US 123 and US 76 head east on Windsor Street, meet the western end of SC 183 (Westminster Highway), and temporarily expand to a four-lane divided highway as they pass under the rail line. The U.S. Highways reduce to two lanes to pass through downtown Westminster, which includes the historic Southern Railway Passenger Station. At the east end of downtown, US 123 and US 76 veer onto Main Street, which becomes a four-lane road with center turn lane. The highways meet the northern end of SC 24 (West Oak Highway) in the eastern part of town. The U.S. Highways' name changes to Sandifer Boulevard as they leave Westminster and expand to a four-lane divided highway. The highways have a partial cloverleaf interchange with SC 11 (Cherokee Foothills Scenic Highway) and cross to the north side of the railroad, then become a four-lane road with center turn lane as they enter the town of Seneca. US 123 and US 76 intersect SC 28 (Blue Ridge Boulevard) and SC 59 (1st North Street), which head north and south, respectively, from the intersection. US 123, US 76, and SC 28 head east concurrently along the north side of Seneca south of Lake Keowee. The highways have a partial cloverleaf interchange with Pine Street before intersecting SC 130, which heads southwest along 1st North Street and northeast along Rochester Highway.

Seneca to Greenville
US 123, US 76, and SC 28 cross the railroad and continue east from Seneca as Clemson Boulevard, a four-lane divided highway. The highways begin to closely parallel the railroad shortly before they meet the western end of SC 93 (Pendleton Road), which provides access to Clemson University. The highways continue as Tiger Boulevard and, after crossing the Keowee River branch of Lake Hartwell into Pickens County, Calhoun Memorial Highway. In the town of Clemson, the three highways intersect SC 133 (College Avenue) before US 76 and SC 28 turn south onto Anderson Highway. US 123 veers away from the railroad and becomes a freeway at its diamond interchange with SC 93 (Old Greenville Highway). The U.S. Highway has diamond interchanges at Issaqueena Trail, at 18 Mile Road on the edge of the town of Central, and at Ruhamah Road (identified as ROAD 17 on directional signs), US 178 (Moorefield Memorial Highway), and Cartee Road around the town of Liberty. US 123 enters the city of Easley and has a partial interchange with US 123 Connector (Ross Avenue), which leads west to SC 93; there is no access from northbound US 123 to the westbound connector route. The freeway ends at the highway's diamond interchange with SC 135 (Pendleton Street), which leads to SC 8.

US 123 continues east as a four-lane road with center turn lane to its directional intersection with the eastern end of SC 93 (Greenville Road), where the U.S. Highway becomes a divided highway again and briefly parallels the Greenville District rail line. The highway has a trumpet interchange with SC 153 on the eastern edge of Easley. US 123 has a directional intersection with the western end of SC 124 (Old Easley Highway) at Greenville-Pickens Speedway before the highway crosses the Saluda River into Greenville County. The U.S. Highway continues as New Easley Road along the edge of the Greenville suburb of Parker, then becomes Easley Bridge Road at its diamond interchange with US 25 (White Horse Road). US 123 reduces to a four-lane undivided highway, crosses over CSX's Belton Subdivision, and enters the city of Greenville just west of its intersection with SC 124 (Pendleton Street) and becomes Academy Street. The highway has a grade crossing with a Norfolk Southern rail line and crosses over the Reedy River and the Swamp Rabbit Trail (formerly Greenville and Northern Railway) on the western edge of downtown Greenville. US 123 intersects both directions of SC 183—Buncombe Street eastbound and College Street westbound—adjacent to the Greenville County Museum of Art before curving east to intersect Main Street and US 29 (Church Street). The highway then curves south and reaches its northern terminus at I-385 Business (North Street) a short distance west of the northern terminus of I-385 adjacent to the Bon Secours Wellness Arena.

National Highway System
The entire length of US 123 is part of the National Highway System, a system of routes determined to be the most important for the nation's economy, mobility, and defense.

History
US 123 replaced all of SC 13 in 1946. SC 13 was SC 17 before 1928.

South Carolina Highway 13

SC 13's Greenville alternate route

South Carolina Highway 13 Alternate (SC 13 Alt.) was an alternate route for the original SC 13 (that was replaced by US 123). It existed in Greenville, South Carolina. It was formed around 1940 from SC 250 (now US 25) to SC 13. Approximately 1950, SC 13 Alt. was decommissioned, and US 123 replaced its path.

Major intersections

Special routes

Seneca business loop

U.S. Route 123 Business (US 123 Bus) was established in 1958 as a renumbering of mainline US 123 through downtown Seneca, via North 1st Street.  It was decommissioned in 2000, renumbered as part of SC 59 and SC 130.

Easley business loop

U.S. Route 123 Business (US 123 Bus) was established in 1958 as a renumbering of mainline US 123 through downtown Easley, via Liberty Drive and Main Street.  It was decommissioned in 1963 when mainline US 123 was rerouted further south along new freeway; the alignment was renumbered as part of SC 93.

Easley connector route

U.S. Route 123 Connector (US 123 Conn.) is a  connector route in the west-central part of Easley that connects SC 93 (Greenville Highway / Liberty Drive) with US 123 (Calhoun Memorial Highway). The connector route is not signed along SC 93 or US 123, but there is signage along its actual path. The entire length is known as Ross Avenue.

US 123 Conn. and Ross Avenue begin at an intersection with SC 93 mainline and travel to the east. Immediately, they curve to the southeast. They curve back to the east just before reaching their eastern terminus, an intersection with US 123.

Greenville alternate route

See also

References

External links

The Highways of South Carolina: US 123
Endpoints of U.S. Highway 123

23-1
1
23-1
23-1
Transportation in Habersham County, Georgia
Transportation in Stephens County, Georgia
Transportation in Oconee County, South Carolina
Transportation in Pickens County, South Carolina
Transportation in Greenville County, South Carolina